Holston is an unincorporated community in Washington County, Virginia, in the United States.

History
A post office was established at Holston in 1831, and remained in operation until it was discontinued in 1966. Legend has it Holston was named for Stephen Holstein, a pioneer explorer.

References

Unincorporated communities in Washington County, Virginia
Unincorporated communities in Virginia